The 1860 United States presidential election in Illinois took place on November 6, 1860, as part of the 1860 United States presidential election. Illinois voters chose 11 representatives, or electors, to the Electoral College, who voted for president and vice president.

Illinois was won by the former congressman Abraham Lincoln (Whig–Illinois), running as a Republican with Senator Hannibal Hamlin, with 50.69% of the popular vote, against Senator Stephen A. Douglas (D–Illinois), running with 41st Governor of Georgia Herschel V. Johnson, with 47.17% of the popular vote.

Liberty Party (under the name Union Party) candidate Gerrit Smith received 35 of his 171 popular votes in Illinois alone. The other 136 votes came from Ohio.

Results

See also
 United States presidential elections in Illinois

References

Illinois
1860
1860 Illinois elections